Głowiński/ Glowinski (feminine: Głowińska/ Glowinska, plural: Głowińscy) is a Polish surname and may refer to:

People
 Bronisław Głowiński, Głowiński monoplane designer
 Idzi Głowiński, 1743-1745 Mayor of Łódź
 Iwona Glowinska, an actress in the movie Wigilia
 Jacques Glowinski (1936–2020), French academic pharmacist
 Mark Glowinski (born 1992), American football guard 
 Michał Głowiński (born 1934), Polish philologist, historian and literary theorist
 Roland Glowinski (1937–2022), French-American mathematician
 Samuel Głowiński, bishop of Lviv, 1733–1776
 Wojciech Głowiński, mayor of Łódź, 1748 and 1761
 Valerie Glowinski, foundation executive director of Zeta Phi Eta

Other uses
 Głowiński monoplane, a 1911 Polish plane

See also
 Głowińsk, a village in Gmina Rypin, Kuyavian-Pomeranian Voivodeship, Poland

Polish-language surnames